The sixth season of iCarly began airing on Nickelodeon on March 24, 2012. This season features Carly Shay (Miranda Cosgrove), Sam Puckett (Jennette McCurdy) and Freddie Benson (Nathan Kress), as their web show, iCarly, is becoming more popular worldwide. iCarly aired its 100th produced episode in this season, making it the first Nickelodeon live-action sitcom to reach that number. Nickelodeon shows like Drake & Josh, Zoey 101 and others usually lasted around 65 episodes. , only Nickelodeon's sketch comedy series All That and Henry Danger had reached a similar number of episodes.

On May 17, 2012, it was announced that this season would be the final season, and the series finale event would air in November 2012. However, Nick promoted the October 6, 2012 episode, "iShock America", as the start of the "final season". The series concluded on November 23, 2012 with a two-part special episode titled "iGoodbye".

Cast

Main cast

 Miranda Cosgrove as Carly Shay
 Jennette McCurdy as Sam Puckett
 Nathan Kress as Freddie Benson
 Jerry Trainor as Spencer Shay
 Noah Munck as Gibby Gibson

Recurring cast

 BooG!e as T-Bo
 Reed Alexander as Nevel Papperman
 Mary Scheer as Marissa Benson
 Jeremy Rowley as Lewbert
 Tim Russ as Principal Franklin
 Mindy Sterling as Miss Briggs
 David St. James as Mr. Howard

Guest stars
 One Direction as themselves ("iGo One Direction")
 Jimmy Fallon as himself ("iShock America")
 Tina Fey as herself ("iShock America")
 Questlove as himself ("iShock America")
 David Chisum as Colonel Steven Shay ("iGoodbye")
 John Ducey as Darnell ("iFind Spencer Friends")
 Emma Stone as Heather ("iFind Spencer Friends")
 Rick Harrison as himself ("iLost My Head in Vegas")
 Austin "Chumlee" Russell as himself ("iLost My Head in Vegas")
 Corey "Big Hoss" Harrison as himself ("iLost My Head in Vegas")

Synopsis
The final season shows their web show getting much more popular as they are invited to night shows, getting brand deals and have special musical guests. They travel to New York to meet Jimmy Fallon. Freddie and Gibby try to be cool and pretend they are in a band. They later travel to Las Vegas, Nevada and meet the Pawn Stars guys. The gang later try to find a suitable adult friend for Spencer, rescue Carly from an old friend of Sam's, and also try to solve the case for Sam's missing laptop. In the last episode, Carly's and Spencer's dad pays a visit and takes Carly to a dance and also takes her to Italy with him, leading to a indefinite hiatus of the iCarly web show.

Episodes

 While these thirteen episodes were produced in a single production season, Nickelodeon advertised "iShock America" (i.e. the first episode of "Part 2") as the start of the "final season".

References

2012 American television seasons
6
Split television seasons